Shanne Braspennincx (born 18 May 1991) is a Dutch track cyclist. She competed at the 2014 and 2015 UCI Track Cycling World Championships. She won the gold medal in the keirin race at the 2020 Summer Olympics.

Career Results

2012
3rd Team Sprint, UEC European U23 Track Championships (with Yesna Rijkhoff)
2013
Grand Prix Sprint Apeldoorn
1st Keirin
1st Sprint
UEC European U23 Track Championships
1st  Keirin
1st  Team Sprint (with Elis Ligtlee)
2014
1st Keirin, Singen
1st Sprint, US Sprint GP
Fastest Man on Wheels
1st Keirin
1st Scratch Race
1st Keirin, Festival of Speed
2nd Keirin, Revolution – Round 4, Manchester
2nd Keirin, Oberhausen
2nd Sprint, Champions of Sprint
2nd Team Sprint, Cottbuser Nächte (with Elis Ligtlee)
Open des Nations sur Piste de Roubaix
2nd Team Sprint (with Elis Ligtlee)
3rd Keirin
UEC European Track Championships
3rd Keirin
3rd Team Sprint (with Elis Ligtlee)
3rd Keirin, Revolution – Round 3, Manchester
3rd Sprint, Öschelbronn
3rd Sprint, Dudenhofen
2015
2nd Keirin, UCI World Track Cycling Championships
Revolution
2nd Keirin – Round 3, Manchester
3rd Sprint – Round 3, Manchester
Independence Day Grand Prix
2nd Sprint
2nd 500m Time Trial
3rd Keirin
2nd Sprint, Grand Prix of Colorado Springs
3rd Keirin, Festival of Speed
2016
3rd Keirin, Grand Prix of Poland
2017
1st Keirin, Fastest Man on Wheels
2nd Internationaal Baan Sprint Keirin Toernooi
3rd Team Sprint, UEC European Track Championships (with Kyra Lamberink)
3rd Keirin, Six Days of Rotterdam
3rd Sprint, Belgian International Track Meeting
2021
1st  Keirin, Olympic Games

References

External links
 
 
 
 
 
 

1991 births
Living people
Dutch female cyclists
Sportspeople from Turnhout
Cyclists from Antwerp Province
Cyclists at the 2019 European Games
European Games medalists in cycling
European Games silver medalists for the Netherlands
European Games bronze medalists for the Netherlands
Olympic cyclists of the Netherlands
Cyclists at the 2020 Summer Olympics
Medalists at the 2020 Summer Olympics
Olympic medalists in cycling
Olympic gold medalists for the Netherlands
20th-century Dutch women
21st-century Dutch women